The Courier-Tribune is the daily newspaper of Asheboro, North Carolina and the surrounding county of Randolph County, North Carolina. It is not the only daily newspaper in Randolph County, North Carolina.  It is owned by Gatehouse Media.  It has been published daily, except Saturday, since 1978.

History
The Courier-Tribune is one of the 10 oldest newspapers published in North Carolina, tracing its roots back to 1876 and Marmaduke Swaim Robins Randolph Regulator newspaper.  It was named the Courier Tribune in 1940 in the merger of Courier (19301940) and Randolph Tribune (19241940).

In November of 2022 Paxton Media Group acquired The Courier-Tribune and five other North Carolina newspapers from Gannett Co., Inc.

See also
 List of newspapers in North Carolina

References

Daily newspapers published in North Carolina